VIZ-Stal is a producer of cold-rolled electrical steels and the largest producer of grain-oriented electrical steel in Russia. Its share of global grain-oriented electrical steel production is almost 11 per cent. Over 80 per cent of its products are exported.

Geography and history
VIZ-Stal was established based on the production facilities of OJSC Verkh-Isetsk plant. The facilities are located in the city of Ekaterinburg (Urals Region), close to main transportation routes to Europe and South-East Asia as well as to ports with all-year-round navigation of the western and eastern coasts of Russia. In 2006, the company became a part of NLMK Group.

Products
Production facilities have an annual capacity to produce about 200,000 tonnes of electrical steel. In 2006, the company produced 180,000 tonnes of grain-oriented steel and 16,000 tonnes of non-grain-oriented steel.

Novolipetsk Steel (NLMK) is the major supplier of hot-rolled coils for further cold rolling at VIZ-Stal. The main customers of electrical steels are Russian companies in the electrical and electronic industry, manufacturers of household electrical and radio appliances, as well as electrical companies abroad.

Employment
At present the company employs nearly 2,300 people.

External links

Steel companies of Russia
Manufacturing companies based in Yekaterinburg
NLMK Group